During the Parade of Nations within the Beijing 2022 Winter Paralympics opening ceremony on March 4, athletes and officials from each participating country marched in the Beijing National Stadium preceded by their flag and placard bearer bearing the respective country's name. Each flag bearer was chosen either by the nation's National Olympic Committee or by the team of athletes themselves.

Parade order
Countries marched in order of the Chinese language. The collation method used was based on the names as written in Simplified Chinese characters and is similar to that used in Chinese dictionaries. The names were sorted by the number of strokes in the first character of the name, then by the stroke order of the character (in the order 橫竖撇捺折, c.f. Wubi method), then the number of strokes and stroke order of the second character, then next character and so on.

The country that will host the next Winter Paralympics, Italy, marched before the host nation China entered, instead of entering between New Zealand and Mexico, according to the Chinese collation order.

Countries and flag bearers
The following is a list of each country's flag bearer. The list is sorted by the sequence that each nation appeared in the Parade of Nations. The names are given in their official designations by the IPC, and the Chinese names follow their official designations by the Beijing Organizing Committee for the 2022 Olympic and Paralympic Winter Games.

References

Parade of Nations
Lists of Paralympic flag bearers
Parades in China